Regions Trust, formerly Regions Morgan Keegan Trust is the trust division of Regions Financial Corporation and its subsidiary Regions Wealth Management. The company, headquartered in Birmingham, Alabama and was created in 2002 when Regions Trust was combined with Morgan Keegan Trust to create Regions Morgan Keegan Trust. The division is made up of Regions Trust, Morgan Asset Management, and RMK Timberland Group.

See also
Regions Financial Corporation
Morgan Keegan & Company

References

External links
Regions Morgan Keegan Website: Regions
Regions Morgan Keegan Website: Morgan Keegan
Regions Financial Corporation official website
Morgan Keegan official website

Regions Financial Corporation
Companies based in Birmingham, Alabama
Financial services companies established in 2002
2002 establishments in Alabama